Short-circuit inductance of a real linear two-winding transformer is inductance measured across the primary or secondary winding when the other winding is short-circuited.　
The method of measuring the short circuit inductance is described in industrial standard. The industrial standard also stipulates a method for obtaining the coupling factor by combining it with the open circuit inductance value.

Measured primary and secondary short-circuit inductances may be considered as constituent parts of primary and secondary self-inductances. They are derived by using Ho-Thevenin's theorem from the equivalent inductance of the three-terminal equivalent circuit as follows. Then they are related according to the coupling factor as,

Where 
k is coupling coefficient 
L1 is primary self-inductance
L2 is secondary self-inductance

where 
 is the short-circuit measurement of primary or secondary inductance
 is the corresponding open-circuit measurement of primary or secondary inductance

Other transformer parameters like leakage inductance and mutual inductance which cannot be directly measured may be defined in terms of k.

Short-circuit inductance is one of the parameters that determines the resonance frequency of the magnetic phase synchronous coupling in a resonant transformer and wireless power transfer. Short-circuit inductance is the main component of the current-limiting parameter in leakage transformer applications.

See also
Resonant inductive coupling

References

Notes 

Electric transformers